Early Morning Wake Up Call is the fourth studio album by Australian new wave group Flash and the Pan, released in 1984 by Epic Records. It was produced by Harry Vanda and George Young, the core members of the group.

Early Morning Wake Up Call peaked at No. 3 on the Swedish Topplistan chart, and No. 18 on the Swiss Hitparade.

Critical reception
Cashbox magazine wrote "This latest collection from the Australian duo of Vanda & Young is a typical collage of novelty-effects synth pop which oozes melodic hooks and eclecticism. While many of the tunes recall classic rock cliches, Flash and the Pan always come up with a way of making them sound original. Distinctly orchestral pieces such as 'Barking At the Moon' and the energised 'Early Morning Wake-Up Call' are the highlights here on an album which will certainly arouse enthusiasm in new music circles."

Track listing
Side one
 "Early Morning Wake Up Call" – 4:06
 "Communication Breakdown" – 3:27
 "Barking at the Moon" – 3:59
 "Downtown Too Long" – 4:20
 "Opera Singers" – 4:51

Side two
"Midnight Man" – 4:56
 "On the Road" – 5:06
 "Look at That Woman Go" – 4:54
 "Fat Night" – 3:57
 "Believe in Yourself" – 4:19

2012 reissue bonus track
"Early Morning Wake Up Call" (instrumental version) – 4:36

Charts

References

External links
 

1984 albums
Flash and the Pan albums